Cambodian honors system consists of a number of orders, decorations and medals through which the country's sovereign awards its citizens for actions or deeds that benefit the nation. The modern system was established under Colonial French Rule and continued with modification after independence until the fall of the Khmer Republic on 17 April 1975.  The current system was reinstated on 5 October 1995 by the Decree for the Establishment and Use of Decorations of Honor of the Kingdom of Cambodia No. 1095/01. The system includes an array of awards, both civil and military, for gallantry, bravery, distinguished service, meritorious service and long service. Various campaign and commemorative medals have also been struck.

History
The Cambodian honors system is based on European/French models. Many of the honors are orders of chivalry granted by royal decree or sub-decree. This system was established under Colonial French Rule and continued with modification after independence until the fall of the Khmer Republic on 17 April 1975.  The current system was reinstated on 5 October 1995 by the Decree for the Establishment and Use of Decorations of Honor of the Kingdom of Cambodia No. 1095/01.  Many of the modern awards have origins from Cambodia's period as a French colony or under the Kingdom of Cambodia under the rule of King Norodom Sihanouk.

Nominating for awards
Under the current system, candidates are nominated by government ministries through a Decoration of Honor Candidate Qualification Review Committee. These committees refer nominations, with justification, to the Council of Ministers for a decision.

Categories of honors and awards
As established by Royal Decree, the hierarchy of decorations of honors are:

Awards for National and Motherland Defense
  Grand Order of National Merit
 Royal Order of Cambodia
  Knight Grand Cross 
  Knight Grand Officer
  Knight Commander
  Knight Officer
  Knight or Chevalier

  National Independence Medal

Royal Household Awards
  Medal of the Crown
  Medal of Norodom I
  Medal of Sisowath I
  Medal of Norodom Sihanouk
  Medal of Norodom Suramarit
  Anussara Medal of Royal Remembrance

Medals of National Defense
  Sena Jayaseddh Medal
 Medal of National Defense
  with gold stars
  with silver stars
  with bronze stars

Multi-Category
 Royal Order of H.M. The Queen Preah Kossomak Nearireath
  Grand Cross
  Grand Officer
  Commander
  Officer
  Knight

 Royal Order of Sahametrei
  Grand Cross
  Grand Officer
  Commander
  Officer
  Knight

 Royal Order of Sowathara
  Grand Cross
  Grand Officer
  Commander
  Officer
  Knight
 Royal Order of Monisaraphon
  Knight Grand Cross
  Knight Grand Officer 
  Knight Commander
  Knight Officer 
  Knight or Chevalier
  Medal of Labour
  Decoration of National Construction
  Khemara Kelarith Sports Medal
  Order of Satrei Vathana (Feminine Merit)

References

External links

Indochina Medals, Cambodia
Orders and Medals Society of America, Cambodia
Decorations Cambodge
Medals Medals of the World, Cambodia